Amrou Bouallegue (born 24 December 1995) is a Tunisian professional basketball player for US Monastir and the Tunisian national team.

Professional career 
He started his career with ES Radès in 2014 and played there for eight seasons, and won two Pro A championships and three Tunisian Cups with the team. Bouallegue signed for US Monastir on 9 November 2022.

National team career 
Bouallegue made his debut for the Tunisia national team on 19 February 2021 during the qualifiers for AfroBasket 2021. He later represented Tunisia at the main tournament of FIBA AfroBasket 2021, where the team won the gold medal.

References

External links

1995 births
Living people
Point guards
Tunisian men's basketball players
ES Radès basketball players
US Monastir basketball players